Mumbai Cutting is a 2008 Indian anthology film comprising eleven short films, telling eleven different stories based on life in Mumbai, which are directed by a host of eleven directors: Anurag Kashyap, Sudhir Mishra, Rahul Dholakia, Kundan Shah, Revathy, Jahnu Barua, Rituparno Ghosh, Shashanka Ghosh, Ruchi Narain, Ayush Raina and Manish Jha.  Music for one of the stories was composed by Ilaiyaraja.

The film is produced by Sahara One and is a Whitecloud production.

Films
 "Anjane Dost", directed by Jahnu Barua
 "Bombay Mumbai Same Shit", directed by Rahul Dholakia
 "Urge", directed by Rituparno Ghosh
 "10 minutes", directed by Shashanka Ghosh
 "And It Rained", directed by Manish Jha
 "Pramod Bhai 23", directed by Anurag Kashyap
 "The Ball", directed by Sudhir Mishra
 "Jo Palti Nahin Woh Rickshaw Kya", directed by Ruchi Narain
 "Bombay High", directed by Ayush Raina
 "Parcel", directed by Revathi
 "Hero", directed by Kundan Shah

Release
Mumbai Cutting had its world premier on 27 April 2008 at ArcLight Hollywood as the closing film of 2008 Indian Film Festival of Los Angeles, thereafter it was also the closing film of the 10th Osian Film Festival in July 2008, though it was commercially unreleased.

References

External links
 

2008 films
2000s Hindi-language films
Indian anthology films
Films set in Mumbai
Films directed by Rahul Dholakia
Films scored by Jeet Ganguly
Films directed by Revathi